Gröning or Groening is a Dutch surname meaning one who wears Green, or a variant of the German Grüning. and may refer to:

 Amy Groening, actress
 Bruno Gröning (1906–1959), was a healer from Germany
 Matt Groening (born 1954), American cartoonist, screenwriter and producer
 Oskar Gröning (1921–2018), German SS-Unterscharführer and Auschwitz concentration camp worker
 Peter Gröning (born 1939), former East German track cyclist
 Philip Gröning (born 1959), German director, documentary film maker, and screenwriter
 Torrie Groening (born 1961), Canadian artist

German-language surnames
Russian Mennonite surnames
Dutch-language surnames